Advincula is a surname. Notable people with the surname include:

Arcenio James Advincula (born 1938), American martial artist
Jose Advincula (born 1952), Filipino Roman Catholic cardinal and archbishop
Luis Advíncula (born 1990), Peruvian footballer
Paul Advincula (born 1964), Filipino basketball coach

See also
23017 Advincula, a main-belt asteroid